Heparin cofactor II (HCII), a protein encoded by the SERPIND1 gene, is a coagulation factor that inhibits IIa, and is a cofactor for heparin and dermatan sulfate ("minor antithrombin").

The product encoded by this gene is a serine protease inhibitor which rapidly inhibits thrombin in the presence of dermatan sulfate or heparin. The gene contains five exons and four introns. This protein shares homology with antithrombin III and other members of the alpha-1 antitrypsin superfamily. Mutations in this gene are associated with heparin cofactor II deficiency. Heparin cofactor II deficiency can lead to increased thrombin generation and a hypercoagulable state.

A purification experiment of heparin cofactor II was performed in 1981, in which it was discovered that the purified version of the protein consists of a single polypeptide chain. Further experimentation demonstrated that whether β-Mercaptoethanol is present does not affect HCII's activity in gel electrophoresis. β-Mercaptoethanol is typically used for the reduction of disulfide bonds within a molecule, but the gel electrophoresis revealed that HCII does not have any of these bonds. The structure is similar to antithrombin III (ATIII), which was known to effectively inhibit thrombin as well as coagulation factor Xa. This experiment suggested that HCII has strong thrombin inhibition, yet weak inhibition of coagulation factor Xa.

Heparin cofactor II may play a role in the immune response, as it has been associated with leukocyte-mediated protein degradation, which releases cytokines in the inflammatory response with neutrophils and monocytes. Its role has been questioned because although it is a thrombin inhibitor, an absence of HCII does not result in significantly higher levels of thrombosis. This does not negate the results of the 1981 study, but novel discoveries create more questions of the biological mechanism and function of the protein. However, this cofactor shows stronger capability in inhibiting thrombin in pregnant women, protecting them from thrombosis. Pregnant women have shown increased levels of heparin cofactor II as well as dermatan sulfate, which is a polysaccharide that is expected to be involved in wound repair, coagulation, and overall maintenance throughout the body. Pregnant women who had thrombosis are likely to also have low levels of heparin cofactor II, but whether this is a causation is still unknown.

References

Further reading

External links
 The MEROPS online database for peptidases and their inhibitors: I04.019
 
 

Cofactors